The 1990 Pittsburgh Steelers season was the franchise's 58th season as a professional sports franchise and as a member of the National Football League.

The Steelers did not score an offensive touchdown until the 5th game of the season, but did rebound to a 9–7 record (the same they posted the previous season).

Unlike the previous season, 9–7 was not enough to gain a playoff berth. The Steelers continued to show improvement overcoming a 1-3 start to find themselves in a showdown with the Oilers in Houston for the AFC's final playoff spot in the final game of the season. However, the Steelers were never in the game as the Oilers beat the Steelers 34-14 ending their season without the playoffs.

Staff

Roster

Preseason

Regular season

Schedule 

Note: Intra-division opponents are in bold text.

Game summaries

Week 1 (Sunday September 9, 1990): at Cleveland Browns 

at Cleveland Municipal Stadium, Cleveland, Ohio

 Game time: 4:00 pm EDT
 Game weather: 
 Game attendance: 78,298
 Referee: Dick Hantak
 TV announcers: (NBC) Don Criqui (play by play), Bob Trumpy (color commentator)

Scoring drives:

 Pittsburgh – FG Anderson 19
 Cleveland – Blaylock 30 fumble return (Kauric kick)
 Cleveland – FG Kauric 28
 Cleveland – FG Kauric 47

Week 2 (Sunday September 16, 1990): vs. Houston Oilers 

at Three Rivers Stadium, Pittsburgh, Pennsylvania

 Game time: 8:00 pm EDT
 Game weather: 56 °F (Cloudy)
 Game attendance: 54,814
 Referee: Gene Barth
 TV announcers: (TNT) Skip Caray (play by play), Pat Haden (color commentator)

Scoring drives:

 Pittsburgh – D. Johnson 26 interception return (Anderson kick)
 Houston – White 1 run (Zendejas kick)
 Pittsburgh – FG Anderson 31
 Houston – Safety, Childress tackled Brister in end zone
 Pittsburgh – FG Anderson 27
 Pittsburgh – Woodson 52 punt return (Anderson kick)

Week 3 (Sunday September 23, 1990): at Los Angeles Raiders 

at Los Angeles Memorial Coliseum, Los Angeles, California

 Game time: 4:00 pm EDT
 Game weather: 
 Game attendance: 50,657
 Referee: Howard Roe
 TV announcers: (NBC) Marv Albert (play by play), Paul Maguire (color commentator)

Scoring drives:

 Pittsburgh – FG Anderson 31
 Los Angeles Raiders – FG Jaeger 40
 Los Angeles Raiders – FG Jaeger 45
 Los Angeles Raiders – Allen 1 run (Jaeger kick)
 Los Angeles Raiders – Fernandez 66 pass from Schroeder (Jaeger kick)

Week 4 (Sunday September 30, 1990): vs. Miami Dolphins 

at Three Rivers Stadium, Pittsburgh, Pennsylvania

 Game time: 1:00 pm EDT
 Game weather: 57 °F (Cloudy)
 Game attendance: 54,691
 Referee: Gerald Austin
 TV announcers: (NBC) Marv Albert (play by play), Paul Maguire (color commentator)

Scoring drives:

 Miami – S. Smith 1 run (Stoyanovich kick)
 Miami – S. Smith 7 run (Stoyanovich kick)
 Clayton 35 pass from Marino (Stoyanovich kick)
 Pittsburgh – FG Anderson 46
 Pittsburgh – FG Anderson 35
 Miami – Paige 1 run (Stoyanovich kick)

Week 5 (Sunday October 7, 1990): vs. San Diego Chargers 

at Three Rivers Stadium, Pittsburgh, Pennsylvania

 Game time: 1:00 pm EDT
 Game weather: 75 °F (Mostly Cloudy)
 Game attendance: 53,486
 Referee: Tom White
 TV announcers: (NBC) Joel Meyers (play by play), Ahmad Rashad (color commentator)

Scoring drives:

 Pittsburgh – FG Anderson 45
 San Diego – Plummer 2 pass from Tolliver (Reveiz kick)
 Pittsburgh – Green 8 pass from Brister (Anderson kick)
 Pittsburgh – Green 1 pass from Brister (Anderson kick)
 Pittsburgh – W. Williams 2 run (Anderson kick)
 San Diego – L. Miller fumble recovery in end zone (Reveiz kick)
 Pittsburgh – Safety, Stone blocked punt out of end zone
 Pittsburgh – FG Anderson 45
 Pittsburgh – Foster 2 run (Anderson kick)

Week 6 (Sunday October 14, 1990): at Denver Broncos 

at Mile High Stadium, Denver, Colorado

 Game time: 4:00 pm EDT
 Game weather: 
 Game attendance: 74,285
 Referee: Jerry Markbreit
 TV announcers: (NBC) Joel Meyers (play by play), Ahmad Rashad (color commentator)

Scoring drives:

 Denver – Winder 1 run (Treadwell kick)
 Denver – FG Treadwell 24
 Pittsburgh – Lipps 6 pass from Brister (Anderson kick)
 Denver – Sewell 2 run (Treadwell kick)
 Pittsburgh – Green 3 pass from Brister (Anderson kick)
 Pittsburgh – Hoge 6 run (Anderson kick)
 Pittsburgh – Green 10 pass from Brister (kick failed)
 Pittsburgh – Green 3 pass from Brister (Anderson kick)

Week 7 (Sunday October 21, 1990): at San Francisco 49ers 

at Candlestick Park, San Francisco, California

 Game time: 4:00 pm EDT
 Game weather: 
 Game attendance: 64,301
 Referee: Jim Tunney
 TV announcers: (NBC) Dick Enberg (play by play), Bill Walsh (color commentator)

Scoring drives:

 Pittsburgh – Bell 2 pass from Brister (Anderson kick)
 San Francisco – FG Cofer 39
 San Francisco – Sherrard 5 pass from Montana (Cofer kick)
 San Francisco – FG Cofer 20
 San Francisco – Rathman 1 run (Cofer kick)
 San Francisco – Rathman 1 run (Cofer kick)

Week 8 (Monday October 29, 1990): vs. Los Angeles Rams 

at Three Rivers Stadium, Pittsburgh, Pennsylvania

 Game time: 9:00 pm EST
 Game weather: 39 °F (Clear)
 Game attendance: 56,466
 Referee: Dick Hantak
 TV announcers: (ABC) Al Michaels (play by play), Frank Gifford & Dan Dierdorf (color commentators)

Scoring drives:

 Los Angeles Rams – Greens 100 kickoff return (Lansford kick)
 Pittsburgh – Hoge 6 pass from Brister (Anderson kick)
 Pittsburgh – Green 17 pass from Brister (Anderson kick)
 Los Angeles Rams – FG Lansford 32
 Pittsburgh – FG Anderson 42
 Pittsburgh – FG Anderson 30
 Pittsburgh – Hoge 1 run (Anderson kick)
 Pittsburgh – Stone 8 pass from Brister (Anderson kick)
 Pittsburgh – Hoge 2 pass from Brister (Anderson kick)

Week 9 (Sunday November 4, 1990): vs. Atlanta Falcons 

at Three Rivers Stadium, Pittsburgh, Pennsylvania

 Game time: 1:00 pm EST
 Game weather: 67 °F (Mostly Cloudy)
 Game attendance: 57,093
 Referee: Johnny Grier
 TV announcers: (CBS) Brad Nessler (play by play), Dan Jiggetts (color commentator)

Scoring drives:

 Atlanta – FG Davis 41
 Atlanta – FG Davis 43
 Atlanta – FG Davis 38
 Pittsburgh – Lipps 11 pass from Brister (Anderson kick)
 Pittsburgh – Mularkey 19 pass from Brister (Anderson kick)
 Pittsburgh – Williams 70 run (Anderson kick)

Week 10 (Sunday November 11, 1990): Bye Week

Week 11 (Sunday November 18, 1990): at Cincinnati Bengals 

at Riverfront Stadium, Cincinnati, Ohio

 Game time: 8:00 pm EST
 Game weather: 
 Game attendance: 60,064
 Referee: Tom Dooley
 TV announcers: (ESPN) Mike Patrick (play by play), Joe Theismann (color commentator)

Scoring drives:

 Cincinnati – Woods 5 run (Breech kick)
 Cincinnati – FG Breech 21
 Cincinnati – Taylor 1 run (Breech kick)
 CIncinnati – Bussey 70 fumble return (Breech kick)
 Pittsburgh – FG Anderson 31
 Cincinnati – FG Breech 33

Week 12 (Sunday November 25, 1990): at New York Jets 

at Giants Stadium, East Rutherford, New Jersey

 Game time: 4:00 pm EST
 Game weather: 
 Game attendance: 57,806
 Referee: Bob McElwee
 TV announcers: (NBC) Marv Albert (play by play), Paul Maguire (color commentator)

Scoring drives:

 New York Jets – Moore 53 pass from O'Brien (Leahy kick)
 Pittsburgh – W. Williams 5 pass from Brister (Anderson kick)
 Pittsburgh – FG Anderson 33
 Pittsburgh – Hoge 1 run (Anderson kick)
 Pittsburgh – Lipps 3 pass from Brister (Anderson kick)

Week 13 (Sunday December 2, 1990): vs. Cincinnati Bengals 

at Three Rivers Stadium, Pittsburgh, Pennsylvania

 Game time: 1:00 pm EST
 Game weather: 45 °F (Mostly Cloudy)
 Game attendance: 58,200
 Referee: Jerry Markbreit
 TV announcers: (NBC) Don Criqui (play by play), Bob Trumpy (color commentator)

Scoring drives:

 Pittsburgh – FG Anderson 32
 Cincinnati – Brown 50 pass from Esiason (Breech kick)
 Pittsburgh – FG Anderson 36
 Cincinnati – Safety, Francis tackled Brister in end zone
 Cincinnati – Brooks 7 run (Breech kick)
 Pittsburgh – FG Anderson 29
 Pittsburgh – FG Anderson 48

Week 14 (Sunday December 9, 1990): vs. New England Patriots 

at Three Rivers Stadium, Pittsburgh, Pennsylvania

 Game time: 1:00 pm EST
 Game weather: 43 °F (Partly Cloudy)
 Game attendance: 48,354
 Referee: Dale Hamer
 TV announcers: (NBC) Tom Hammond (play by play), Joe Namath (color commentator)

Scoring drives:

 Pittsburgh – FG Anderson 42
 Pittsburgh – Hoge 8 run (Anderson kick)
 New England – FG Staurovsky 49
 Pittsburgh – Green 14 pass from Brister (Anderson kick)
 Pittsburgh – Hoge 41 run (Anderson kick)

Week 15 (Sunday December 16, 1990): at New Orleans Saints 

at Louisiana Superdome, New Orleans, Louisiana

 Game time: 1:00 pm EST
 Game weather: Dome
 Game attendance: 68,582
 Referee: Howard Roe
 TV announcers: (NBC) Marv Albert (play by play), Paul Maguire (color commentator)

Scoring drives:

 Pittsburgh – FG Anderson 29
 New Orleans – FG Andersen 50
 New Orleans – FG Andersen 43
 Pittsburgh – FG Anderson 42
 Pittsburgh – FG Anderson 43

Week 16 (Sunday December 23, 1990): vs. Cleveland Browns 

at Three Rivers Stadium, Pittsburgh, Pennsylvania

 Game time: 1:00 pm EST
 Game weather: 36 °F (Fog)
 Game attendance: 51,665
 Referee: Johnny Grier
 TV announcers: (NBC) Joel Meyers (play by play), Ahmad Rashad (color commentator)

Scoring drives:

 Pittsburgh – Mularkey 20 pass from Brister (Anderson kick)
 Pittsburgh – Calloway 20 pass from Brister (Anderson kick)
 Pittsburgh – Mularkey 2 pass from Brister (Anderson kick)
 Pittsburgh – Hoge 20 pass from Brister (Anderson kick)
 Pittsburgh – W. Williams 1 run (Anderson kick)

Week 17 (Sunday December 30, 1990): at Houston Oilers 

at Astrodome, Houston, Texas

 Game time: 8:00 pm EST
 Game weather: Dome
 Game attendance: 56,906
 Referee: Gerald Austin
 TV announcers: (ESPN) Mike Patrick (play by play), Joe Theismann (color commentator)

Scoring drives:

 Houston – White 1 run (Garcia kick)
 Houston – Givins 14 pass from Carlson (Garcia kick)
 Houston – Hill 3 pass from Carlson (Garcia kick)
 Houston – FG Garcia 47
 Pittsburgh – Hoge 4 run (Anderson kick)
 Houston – Jeffires 53 pass from Carlson (Garcia kick)
 Pittsburgh – Hoge 3 run (Anderson kick)
 Houston – FG Garcia 45

Standings

References

External links
 1990 Pittsburgh Steelers season at Profootballreference.com 
 1990 Pittsburgh Steelers season statistics at jt-sw.com

Pittsburgh Steelers seasons
Pittsburgh Steelers
Pitts